The 1972–73 season was Cardiff City F.C.'s 46th season in the Football League. They competed in the 22-team Division Two, then the second tier of English football, finishing twentieth.

The season also saw Cardiff-born Phil Dwyer, who would go on to break the club's appearance record, make his debut for the club.

Players

Source.

League standings

Results by round

Fixtures and results

Second Division

Source

League Cup

FA Cup

Welsh Cup

See also
Cardiff City F.C. seasons

References

Bibliography

Welsh Football Data Archive

1972-72
Association football clubs 1972–73 season
Card